Daasi is a 1988 Indian Telugu-language drama film written and directed by B. Narsing Rao starring Archana as Daasi Kamalakshi. The film won five honors including Best Feature Film in Telugu at the 36th National Film Awards, "For portraying the grim reality of a feaudal milieu through original and rare use of film language" as cited by the Jury, and the Diploma of Merit award at the 16th Moscow International Film Festival in 1989. The film was subsequently screened in the Indian Panorama at the 12th International Film Festival of India.

Plot
The story is of Kamalakshi (Archana), a bonded woman known as Daasi in Hyderabad State in the 1920s in Telangana region. She has been sold by her family for money to be the servant of a wealthy couple. She is expected to do every chore imaginable in their house. She is also required to be the sexual toy of the man of the house (Dora) and his guests - anywhere and at any time of the day or night. When she becomes pregnant, she endures and hopes to keep the baby. However she is forced to have an abortion.

Cast 
Archana as Kamalakshi 
Bhoopal Reddy
Roopa (actress)
Ananda Chakrapani

Awards
National Film Awards
National Film Award for Best Feature Film in Telugu - B. Narsing Rao
National Film Award for Best Cinematography - Apurba Kishore Bir
National Film Award for Best Actress - Archana 
National Film Award for Best Costume Design - Sudarshan
National Film Award for Best Art Direction - T. Vaikundham

References

External links
 

1988 films
1980s Telugu-language films
Films about prostitution in India
Films whose cinematographer won the Best Cinematography National Film Award
Films about Indian slavery
Films featuring a Best Actress National Award-winning performance
Films about human trafficking in India
Films whose production designer won the Best Production Design National Film Award
Films about women in India
Films that won the Best Costume Design National Film Award
Best Telugu Feature Film National Film Award winners
Films directed by B. Narsing Rao
Films set in Telangana